Divaldo Suruagy (March 5, 1937 – March 21, 2015) was a Brazilian economist and politician. Suruagy served as the Governor of Brazilian state of Alagoas for three tenures: 1975–1978, 1983–1986, and 1995–1997.

See also
 List of mayors of Maceió

References

1937 births
2015 deaths
Governors of Alagoas
Members of the Chamber of Deputies (Brazil) from Alagoas
Brazilian economists